Odds and evens may refer to:

Odds and evens (hand game), a two-player guessing game using fingers
Odds and evens (patience), a solitaire variant of the card game Royal Cotillion
Odds and Evens (film), a 1978 Italian action-comedy movie
Parity (mathematics), the concept of odd and even integers

See also
Odd and Even, another solitaire card game